United States v. Hansen (Docket 22-179) is a pending United States Supreme Court case about whether a federal law that criminalizes encouraging or inducing illegal immigration is unconstitutionally overbroad, violating the First Amendment right to free speech.

Background
Helaman Hansen operated an adult adoption program which he falsely claimed would lead to citizenship for undocumented immigrants. He persuaded victims to illegally come to the United States or overstay their visas. In a 2017 federal court trial, a jury convicted him of multiple counts of mail fraud, wire fraud, and encouraging or inducing illegal immigration for financial gain. The district court sentenced Hansen to 20 years in prison.

The two counts of encouraging or inducing were for violations of 8 U.S.C. § 1324(a)(1)(A)(iv), which states that it is a crime to "encourage[] or induce[] an alien to come to, enter, or reside in the United States, knowing or in reckless disregard of the fact that such coming to, entry, or residence is or will be in violation of law". Hansen appealed to the U.S. Court of Appeals for the Ninth Circuit, arguing that this provision was unconstitutionally overbroad under the First Amendment.

Meanwhile, the Court of Appeals was deciding another case, United States v. Sineneng-Smith, involving the same First Amendment question, and put Hansen's case on hold. Sineneng-Smith went to the Supreme Court, but the Supreme Court in 2020 decided that case on a procedural issue without deciding the First Amendment question.

Afterwards, the court of appeals resumed Hansen's case, ruling in Hansen's favor that the law was overbroad and unconstitutional. The government petitioned to the Supreme Court, which agreed to hear the case.

Case information 
In February 2023, the ACLU along with the Federal Defender’s Office for the Eastern District of California filed a brief on behalf of Hansen, where they urged the Supreme Court to strike down the statute for violating the First Amendment. The ACLU argues that because the "encouragement" provision of the statute is so broad, it would make it a crime "for a grandmother to express a wish that her undocumented grandchild not leave the country, or for an attorney to advise that a noncitizen will forfeit statutory or constitutional rights or benefits if she leaves the country."

The Cato Institute, which filed an amicus brief in favor of Hansen, argued, "A law is facially overbroad when the amount of unprotected speech that it legitimately forbids is eclipsed by the amount of protected speech that it suppresses."

The federal government, in their brief, defends the law by arguing that "for more than a century, federal law has prescribed criminal penalties for 'encouraging' or 'inducing' certain violations of the immigration laws." As its starting point in defense of the law, the government's brief points to "the first general immigration statute" that Congress passed in 1882.

Organizations filing an amicus brief include the National Immigration Project of the National Lawyers Guild, Asian Americans Advancing Justice, City and County of San Francisco, The Rutherford Institute, The Foundation for Individual Rights and Expression, the Electronic Frontier Foundation, the First Amendment Coalition Freedom of the Press Foundation, National Association of Criminal Defense Lawyers, Immigration Reform Law Institute, and Pfizer Inc. 

The State of Montana also filed a brief on behalf of itself and 25 other U.S. states, encouraging the Supreme Court to reverse the appeals court decision, keeping the law in tact.

References 

United States Supreme Court cases
2023 in United States case law
United States Supreme Court cases of the Roberts Court
Overbreadth case law
United States immigration and naturalization case law